is a Japanese animator, storyboard artist, and director.

Anime involved in
Cookin' Idol I! My! Mine!: Director
Elfen Lied: 2nd Key Animation, Key Animation (ep 10)
Fantastic Detective Labyrinth: Director, Storyboard, Episode Director, Key Animation
Fist of the North Star (1986 film): Key Animation
Gekijōban Meiji Tokyo Renka: Yumihari no Serenade: Director
Guyver: Out of Control: Director, Key Animation
Hell Girl: Storyboard (ep. 24), Draft Proposal
Hell Girl: Two Mirrors: Original Script, Storyboard (eps. 4, 10), Episode Director (ep. 10)
Hell Girl: Three Vessels: Director, Storyboard (ep 1), Episode Director (eps 1, 26), Original Concept
Hetalia The Beautiful World: Director, Storyboard (episodes 5, 15), Episode Director (episodes 5, 15)
Hetalia The World Twinkle: Director
If I See You in My Dreams (OVA): Director, Character Design
If I See You in My Dreams (TV): Supervision
Jing: King of Bandits: Director, Storyboard
Jing, King of Bandits: Seventh Heaven: Director, Storyboard
Magical Princess Minky Momo: Character Design
Meganebu!: Assistant Director
Nameko: Sekai no Tomodachi: Director
Samurai Champloo: In-Between Animation (Triple A; episodes 11–12, 26)
Shining Tears X Wind: Director
Slayers Excellent: Director
Slayers Gorgeous: Director, Storyboard
Slayers Great: Director, Key Animation
Slayers Return: Director, Key Animation
Slayers Special (OVA): Director
Slayers The Motion Picture: Director
Sorcerous Stabber Orphen: Series Director, Storyboard (episode 15)
Star Ocean EX: Director, Storyboard, Key Animation
Tactics: Director, Storyboard, Episode Director
The Law of Ueki: Director, Unit Director (Opening)
The Mythical Detective Loki Ragnarok: Director, Storyboard (Opening; episode 1), Episode Director (episode 1)
Video Girl Ai: Director, Executive producer

References

External links
 

Anime directors
Living people
People from Kumamoto
Slayers
Japanese animators
Japanese animated film directors
Japanese storyboard artists
Year of birth missing (living people)